was a Japanese theoretical physicist known for his work on CP-violation who was awarded one quarter of the 2008 Nobel Prize in Physics "for the discovery of the origin of the broken symmetry which predicts the existence of at least three families of quarks in nature."

Early life and education
Maskawa was born in Nagoya, Japan. After World War II ended, the Maskawa family operated as a sugar wholesaler. A native of Aichi Prefecture, Toshihide Maskawa graduated from Nagoya University in 1962 and received a Ph.D. degree in particle physics from the same university in 1967. His doctoral advisor was the physicist Shoichi Sakata.

From early life Maskawa liked trivia, also studied mathematics, chemistry, linguistics and various books. In high school, he loved novels, especially detective and mystery stories and novels by Ryūnosuke Akutagawa.

Career
At Kyoto University in the early 1970s, he collaborated with Makoto Kobayashi on explaining broken symmetry (the CP violation) within the Standard Model of particle physics.  Maskawa and Kobayashi's theory required that there be at least three generations of quarks, a prediction that was confirmed experimentally four years later by the discovery of the bottom quark.

Maskawa and Kobayashi's 1973 article, "CP Violation in the Renormalizable Theory of Weak Interaction", is the fourth most cited high energy physics paper of all time as of 2010. The Cabibbo–Kobayashi–Maskawa matrix, which defines the mixing parameters between quarks was the result of this work. Kobayashi and Maskawa were jointly awarded half of the 2008 Nobel Prize in Physics for this work, with the other half going to Yoichiro Nambu.

Maskawa was director of the Yukawa Institute for Theoretical Physics from 1997 to 2003.  He was special professor and director general of Kobayashi-Maskawa Institute for the Origin of Particles and the Universe at Nagoya University, director of Maskawa Institute for Science and Culture at Kyoto Sangyo University and professor emeritus at Kyoto University.

Nobel Lecture
On 8 December 2008, after Maskawa told the audience "Sorry, I cannot speak English", he delivered his Nobel lecture on “What Did CP Violation Tell Us?” in Japanese language, at Stockholm University. The audience followed the subtitles on the screen behind him.

Death
Maskawa died on 23 July 2021 in Kyoto, Japan, aged 81.

Professional record
July 1967 – Research Associate of the Faculty of Science, Nagoya University
May 1970 – Research Associate of the Faculty of Science, Kyoto University
April 1976 – Associate Professor of the Institute for Nuclear Study, University of Tokyo
April 1980 – Professor of the Research Institute for Fundamental Physics (present Yukawa Institute for Theoretical Physics), Kyoto University
November 1990 – Professor of the Faculty of Science, Kyoto University
 1995 – Councilor, Kyoto University
 1997
 January – Professor of Yukawa Institute for Theoretical Physics, Kyoto University
 April – Director of Yukawa Institute for Theoretical Physics, Kyoto University
 2003
 April – Professor Emeritus of Kyoto University
 April – Professor of Kyoto Sangyo University (till May 2009)
 October 2004 – Director of the Research Institute, Kyoto Sangyo University
 October 2007 – Distinguished Invited University Professor of Nagoya University
 2009
 February – Trustee of Kyoto Sangyo University 
 March – University Professor of Nagoya University
 June – Head of Maskawa Juku and Professor, Kyoto Sangyo University (till March 2019)
 2010
 April – Director of the Kobayashi-Maskawa Institute for the Origin of Particles and the Universe (KMI) at Nagoya University
 December – Member of the Japan Academy
 2018
 April – Director Emeritus of KMI at Nagoya University
 April 2019 – Professor Emeritus of Kyoto Sangyo University

Recognition

1979 – Nishina Memorial Prize
1985 – Sakurai Prize
1985 – Japan Academy Prize
1995 – Asahi Prize
1995 – Chu-Nichi Culture Prize
2007 – High Energy and Particle Physics Prize by European Physical Society
2008 – Nobel Prize in Physics
2008 – Order of Culture
2010 – Member of Japan Academy

Political proposition

In 2013, Maskawa and chemistry Nobel laureate Hideki Shirakawa issued a statement against the Japanese State Secrecy Law." The following is Maskawa's main political proposition:

Support for Article 9 of the Japanese Constitution
Criticizing Japanese politician visits to the Yasukuni Shrine
Support for selective couple surname system

See also
 Progress of Theoretical Physics
 List of Japanese Nobel laureates
 List of Nobel laureates affiliated with Kyoto University

References

External links
Kobayashi-Maskawa Institute for the Origin of Particles and the Universe (KMI), Nagoya University
 

1940 births
2021 deaths
People from Nagoya
Japanese Nobel laureates
Japanese physicists
Nobel laureates in Physics
Recipients of the Order of Culture
Theoretical physicists
J. J. Sakurai Prize for Theoretical Particle Physics recipients
Particle physicists
Nagoya University alumni
Academic staff of Nagoya University